Srednyaya Sluda is a rural locality (a village) in Dvinitskoye Rural Settlement, Syamzhensky District, Vologda Oblast, Russia. The population was 9 as of 2002.

Geography 
Srednyaya Sluda is located 50 km northeast of Syamzha (the district's administrative centre) by road. Novaya Sluda is the nearest rural locality.

References 

Rural localities in Syamzhensky District